Moti Chun Ke is a sad song collection by Punjabi singer Kamal Heer. The music was composed and produced by Sangtar.

Track listing

Award nominations
Moti Chun Ke was nominated for "Best Folk-Pop Album" at the 2009 PTC Punjabi Music Awards. Also the song "Hathiar Na Chaliye" got Kamal Heer nominated for "Best Folk-Pop Vocalist".

References

2008 greatest hits albums
Kamal Heer albums
Punjabi-language songs